This is a list of buildings and infrastructures above  in Switzerland. As this height approximately corresponds to the level of the climatic snow line in the Alps, infrastructures located above it are generally subject to harsh weather conditions and are more difficult to build. This list also includes structures located precisely on the Italian border (*) that could be partially in Switzerland.

List

See also
List of highest railway stations in Switzerland
List of mountains of Switzerland above 3000 m
List of mountain huts in the Alps

References
Swisstopo topographic maps

Mountaineering in Switzerland